Bryan Josué Oviedo Jiménez (born 18 February 1990) is a Costa Rican professional footballer who plays as a left-back or left midfielder for Real Salt Lake and the Costa Rica national team.

He was selected for the Costa Rica national team at the Copa América Centenario and the 2018 and 2022 FIFA World Cup. Oviedo has previously represented Saprissa, Nordsjælland, Everton and Sunderland.

Club career

Copenhagen
In early 2010 he signed for Danish club Copenhagen.

Everton
On 31 August 2012, Oviedo signed for English side Everton for an undisclosed fee. He made his debut as an 85th-minute substitute during a 3–0 away league win over Swansea City in September. Oviedo was very much a squad player during his first season with Everton as he made 15 league appearances, 14 of those as a substitute. In 2012, in a starting 11 against Norwich City, Oviedo picked up his first assist for the club. He scored his first goal for Everton on 30 November 2013 in a 4–0 win over Stoke City, also picking up an assist. Four days later he scored against Manchester United in the 86th minute in a 1–0 win, leading Everton to their first win at Old Trafford in 21 years.

On 25 January 2014, Oviedo suffered a broken left leg 18 minutes into the Stevenage vs Everton FA Cup Fourth Round tie. He sustained the injury from a tackle on Stevenage midfielder Simon Heslop, a clean break to both his tibia and fibula.

Immediately after the game, speaking to BT Sport, Everton manager Roberto Martínez said "A real negative today is the unfortunate incident and we need to give Bryan as much support as we can now. He's had a terrific season and I've been very impressed with him. He's an important player in the group and he deserves a speedy recovery. The injury to Bryan affected everyone. Those type of injuries leave a sick taste."
Everton later confirmed that Oviedo would require surgery to heal a double fracture of his left leg.
In May 2014, Oviedo said he was unable to recover from his injury in time to be ready for the 2014 World Cup with his national team.

Oviedo returned from injury on 23 September in Everton's 3–0 defeat at Swansea City in the second round of the League Cup; he started the match before being replaced after 58 minutes by James McCarthy.

Sunderland
On 30 January 2017, Oviedo and former Everton teammate Darron Gibson joined Sunderland on permanent deals; with Oviedo penning a three-and-a-half-year deal, taking him up to the summer of 2020; while Gibson signed a one-a-half-year deal to reunite with former manager David Moyes. On 4 February 2017, Oviedo made his Sunderland debut in a 4–0 win against Crystal Palace at Selhurst Park.

Return to Copenhagen
In July 2019 he re-signed for FC Copenhagen. After three seasons at Copenhagen, with only 33 appearances, Oviedo's contract with the Danish club came to an end in June 2022 and was not extended.

Real Salt Lake
On 5 August 2022, Oviedo signed with Major League Soccer club Real Salt Lake.

International career
In 2007, Oviedo represented Costa Rica at the CONCACAF U17 Tournament (a precursor to the CONCACAF U17 Championship). Oviedo played in all three games, beating Trinidad and Tobago 2–0, drawing 0–0 with Canada and losing 2–1 to United States. Costa Rica finished in second place in Group B and qualifying for the 2007 FIFA U-17 World Cup. Oviedo was not selected in the U17 World Cup squad.

Two years later Oviedo was named in the 2009 CONCACAF U-20 Championship squad. Oviedo's Costa Rica beat Mexico 1–0 in their opening game, drew 0–0 with Trinidad and Tobago and beat Canada 2–1 in the final group stage game. Oviedo was not named in the team for the semi-final against Honduras but played in the final where Costa Rica beat USA 3–0. Due to the successful campaign in the U-20 Championship, Costa Rica qualified for the 2009 FIFA U-20 World Cup. Oviedo retained his place in the national under 20 team and was named in the squad for the U-20 World Cup.

The U20 World Cup did not get off to the best of starts. Oviedo featured in the team in a 5–0 loss to Brazil in Costa Rica's opening game in Group E. In the second game he helped Costa Rica defeat Australia 3–0 and was also named in the team that lost their final group game against Czech Republic 3–2. The three points were enough to qualify and Costa Rica defeated hosts Egypt 2–0 in front of 81,860 in the knock out stage. Costa Rica beat United Arab Emirates 2–1 after extra time in the quarter finals and lost to Brazil 1–0 at the semi-final stage. The Costa Ricans met Hungary in the third place playoff where they were defeated on penalties after a 1–1 draw.

His debut match with the Costa Rica national team was against Argentina on 26 January 2010.

Oviedo was named in the Costa Rica national team for the 2011 CONCACAF Gold Cup. Costa Rica finished second in Group A after opening with a 5–0 win against Cuba, a 1–1 draw with El Salvador ensuring qualification before losing 4–1 to Mexico in the final group stage game. Costa Rica were knocked out of the competition following a penalty shootout after a 1–1 draw with Honduras.

In May 2018 he was named in Costa Rica's 23-man squad for the 2018 FIFA World Cup in Russia.

Career statistics

Club

International

Scores and results list Costa Rica's goal tally first, score column indicates score after each Oviedo goal.

Honours
Copenhagen
Danish Superliga: 2009–10, 2021–22
Danish Cup: 2010–11, 2011–12

Costa Rica
UNCAF Nations Cup runner-up: 2011

Individual
Danish Cup Player of the Year: 2011–12

Notes

References

External links

Profile at Sunderland A.F.C.

1990 births
Living people
People from San Carlos (canton)
Association football defenders
Costa Rican footballers
Costa Rica international footballers
Costa Rica under-20 international footballers
Costa Rican people of Spanish descent
Deportivo Saprissa players
F.C. Copenhagen players
FC Nordsjælland players
Everton F.C. players
Sunderland A.F.C. players
Real Salt Lake players
Liga FPD players
Danish Superliga players
Premier League players
English Football League players
Costa Rican expatriate footballers
Expatriate men's footballers in Denmark
Expatriate footballers in England
Expatriate soccer players in the United States
Costa Rican expatriate sportspeople in Denmark
Costa Rican expatriate sportspeople in England
Costa Rican expatriate sportspeople in the United States
2009 CONCACAF U-20 Championship players
2011 CONCACAF Gold Cup players
Copa América Centenario players
2017 CONCACAF Gold Cup players
2018 FIFA World Cup players
2019 CONCACAF Gold Cup players
2021 CONCACAF Gold Cup players
2022 FIFA World Cup players
Major League Soccer players